C. indicum may refer to:
 Chaetoderma indicum, a mollusc species in the genus Chaetoderma
 Chaetomium indicum, a fungus
 Chiloscyllium indicum, the slender bamboo shark, a shark species found in the Indo-West Pacific Oceans
 Chrysanthemum indicum, a flowering plant species

See also
 Indicum (disambiguation)